Sarcocystis is a genus of parasitic Apicomplexan alveolates. Species in this genus infect reptiles, birds and mammals. The name is derived from Greek: sarkos = flesh and kystis = bladder.

There are about 130 recognised species in this genus. Revision of the taxonomy of this genus is ongoing and it is possible that all the currently recognised species may in fact be a single species or much smaller number of species that can infect multiple hosts.

The parasite's life cycle typically involves a predator and a prey animal.  A single species may infect multiple prey or predator animals.  In at least 56 species definitive and intermediate hosts are known. Many species are named after their recognised hosts

Further material on this genus can be found on the Sarcocystis page.

Mammalian species infected

Superorder Euarchontoglires 

Order Lagomorpha

 rabbit (Oryctolagus cuniculus)
 cottontail rabbits (Sylvilagus floridanus)

Order Primates

human (Homo sapiens)
slow loris (Nycticebus coucang)
baboon (Papio cynocephalus)
tamarin (Saguinus oedipus)

Genus Macaca
crab-eating macaque (Macaca fascicularis)
rhesus monkey (Macaca mulatta)

Order Rodentia

Family Cricetidae

varying lemming (Dicrostonyx richardsoni)
prairie voles (Microtus ochrogaster)
woodrat (Neotoma micropus)
muskrat (Ondatra zibethica)
Djungarian hamsters (Phodopus sungorus)
deer mice (Peromyscus maniculatus)
cotton rat (Sigmodon hispidus)

Family Erinaceidae

moonrat (Echinosorex gymnura)

Family Muridae

bandicoot rat (Bandicota indica)
African soft-furred rat (Mastomys natalensis)
house mouse (Mus musculus)
Mongolian gerbil (Meriones unguiculatus)
Sulawesi giant rat (Paruromys dominator)

Genus Bunomys
yellow-haired hill rat (Bunomys chrysocomus)
fraternal hill rat (Bunomys fratrorum)

Genus Maxomys
Bartels's spiny rat (Maxomys bartelsii)
Musschenbroek's spiny rat (Maxomys musschenbroekii)

Genus Rattus
Polynesian rat (Rattus exulans)
bush rat (Rattus fuscipes)
brown rats (Rattus norvegicus)
yellow-tailed rat (Rattus xanthurus)

Family Sciuridae

eastern chipmunk (Tamias striatus)

Genus Spermophilus

Richardson's ground squirrel (Spermophilus richardsonii)
13-lined ground squirrels (Spermophilus tridecemlineatus tridecemlineatus)

Superorder Laurasiatheria 

Order Artiodactyla

Suborder Ruminantia

Family Antilocapridae

pronghorn (Antilocapra americana)

Family Bovidae

water buffalo (Bubalus bubalis)
Grant's gazelle (Nanger granti)
mountain goat (Oreamnos americanus)
Mongolian gazelle (Procapra gutturosa)
chamois (Rupicapra rupicapra)
African buffalo (Syncerus caffer)

Genus Bison
bison (Bison bison)
wisent (Bison bonasus)

Genus Bos
yak (Bos grunniens)
cattle (Bos taurus)
dwarf zebu (Bos taurus)

Genus Capra
goat (Capra aegagrus hircus)
alpine ibex (Capra ibex)

Genus Ovis
European mouflons (Ovis ammon musimon)
sheep (Ovis aries)

Family Cervidae

moose (Alces alces)
mule deer (Odocoileus hemionus)
reindeer (Rangifer tarandus tarandus)

Genus Cervus
American elk (Cervus canadensis)
roe deer (Cervus capreolus)
hard ground swamp deer (Cervus duvauceli branderi)
red deer (Cervus elaphus)
elk (Cervus elaphus)

Genus Dama
fallow deer (Dama dama dama)
Persian fallow deer (Dama dama mesopotamica)

Family Giraffidae

giraffe (Giraffa camelopardalis)

Suborder Suina

warthog (Phacochoerus aethiopicus)
pig (Sus scrofa scrofa)

Suborder Tylopoda

Genus Camelus

camel (Camelus dromedarius)

Genus Lama

llama (Lama glama)
guanaco (Lama guanicoe)

Genus Vicugna
vicuña (Vicugna vicugna)
alpaca (Vicugna pacos)

Order Carnivora

Suborder Caniformia

Family Canidae

Genus Nyctereutes

raccoon dog (Nyctereutes procyonoides)

Genus Vulpes

red fox (Vulpes vulpes)

Tribe Canini 

Genus Canis

dog (Canis lupus familiaris)
coyote (Canis latrans)
wolf (Canis lupus)

Genus Lycaon

wild dog (Lycaon pictus)

Superfamily Pinnipedia

Family Phocidae

bearded seal (Erignathus barbatus)
Hawaiian monk seal (Monachus schauinslandi)
Pacific harbor seals (Phoca vitulina richardsi)

Family Otariidae
northern fur seal (Callorhinus ursinus)
sea lion (Zalophus californianus)

Family Mustelidae

sea otter (Enhydra lutris)
otter (Lutra lutra)
European badger (Meles meles)
skunk (Mephitis mephitis)
American badger (Taxidea taxus)

Genus Mustela

common European weasel (Mustela nivalis)
mink (Mustela vison)

Family Procyonidae

raccoon (Procyon lotor)

Family Ursidae

Genus Ursus

black bears (Ursus americanus)
polar bears (Ursus maritimus)

Suborder Feloidea

Genus Felis

cougar (Felis concolor coryi)
cougar (Felis concolor stanleyana)
cat (Felis domesticus)
bobcats (Felis rufus floridanus)

Genus Panthera

African lions (Panthera leo)
leopards (Panthera pardus)
tigers (Panthera tigris)

Order Cetacea

beluga whale (Delphinapterus leucas)
Atlantic white-sided dolphins (Lagenorhynchus acutus)
striped dolphin (Stenella coeruleoalba)

Order Perissodactyla

Genus Equus

donkey (Equus asinus)
horse (Equus caballus)

Superorder Xenarthra 

Hoffmann's two-toed sloth (Choloepus hoffmanni)
nine-banded armadillo (Dasypus novemcinctus)

Marsupials 

Bennett's wallaby (Macropus rufogriseus)
unadorned rock wallaby (Petrogale assimilis)
Tasmanian pademelon (Thylogale billardierii)

Genus Didelphis 

white-eared opossum (Didelphis albiventris)
Virginia opossum (Didelphis virginiana)

Bird species infected

This genus infects at least 11 orders, 22 families, 38 genera and 46 species.

Order Anseriformes

Family Anatidae

redhead duck (Aythya americana)
Canada goose (Branta canadensis)
common goldeneye (Bucephala clangula)
blue-winged teal (Querquedula discors)

Genus Anas

northern pintail (Anas acuta)
northern shoveler (Anas clypeata)
blue-winged teal (Anas discors)
mallard (Anas platyrhynchos)
American black duck (Anas rubripes)
gadwall (Anas strepera)

Order Ciconiiformes

Family Ardeidae

great blue heron (Ardea herodias)
green backed herons (Butorides striatus)
great egret (Casmerodius albus)
little blue heron (Egretta caerulea)

Family Threskiornithidae 

American white ibis (Eudocimus albus)

Order Charadriiformes

Family Scolopacidae

Wilson's snipe (Gallinago delicata)
American woodcock (Scolopax minor)

Order Coliiformes
 
Family Coliidae 

red-faced mousebird (Urocolius indicus)

Order Columbiformes

Family Columbidae

morning doves (Zenaida macroura)

Order Falconiformes

Family Accipitridae

Cooper's hawk (Accipiter cooperii)
goshawk (Accipiter gentilis)
sparrowhawk (Accipiter nisus)
red-tailed hawk (Buteo jamaicensis)
bald eagle (Haliaeetus leucocephalus)

Family Falconidae

falconids (genus Falco)

Order Galliformes

Family Phasianidae

wild turkey (Meleagris gallopavo)
common pheasant (Phasianus colchicus)
sharp-tailed grouse (Tympanuchus phasianellus)

Family Tetraonidae

capercaillies (Tetrao urogallus)

Order Passeriformes

Family Fringillidae

canary (Serinus canaria)

Family Icteridae

great-tailed grackle (Cassidix mexicanus)
cowbirds (Molothrus ater)
common crackle (Quiscalus quiscula)

Family Paridae

great tit (Parus major)

Family Turdidae

European blackbird (Turdus merula)

Order Pelecaniformes
 
Family Sulidae

northern gannet (Morus bassanus)

Order Phoenicopteriformes
 
Family Phoenicopteridae

lesser flamingo (Phoeniconaias minor)

Order Psittaciformes

Family Psittacidae

Patagonian conure (Cyanoliseus patagonus)
budgerigars (Melopsittacus undulatus)
thick-billed parrot (Rhynchopsitta pachyrhyncha)

Order Strigiformes

Family Strigidae

long-eared owl (Asio otus)
snowy owls (Nyctea scandiaca)

Genus Strix
northern spotted owl (Strix occidentalis caurina)
barred owl (Strix varia)

Family Tytonidae

Genus Tyto

European barn owl (Tyto alba)
masked owl (Tyto novaehollandiae)

Reptile species infected

Snakes 

Family Colubridae

Dahl's whip snake (Coluber najadum)
Rio tropical racer (Mastigodryas bifossatus)
gopher snake (Pituophis melanoleucus)
bullsnake (Pituophis melanoleucus sayi)

Family Elapidae

tiger snake (Notechis ater)

Family Pythonidae

black-headed python (Aspidites melanocephalus)
carpet python (Morelia spilotes)
Malaysian reticulated python (Python reticulatus)

Family Viperidae

southern copperhead (Agkistrodon contortrix contortrix)
Mojave rattlesnake (Crotalus scutulatus scutulatus)
Arabian saw-scaled viper (Echis coloratus)
desert viper (Pseudocerastes persicus)
Palestinian viper (Daboia palaestinae)

Lizards 

Family Chamaeleonidae

Fischer's chameleon (Chamaleo fischeri)

Family Gekkonidae

Mediterranean house gecko (Hemidactylus turcicus)
fan-footed gecko (Ptyodactylus guttatus)
Jordan short-fingered gecko (Stenodactylus grandiceps)

Family Lacertidae

Gran Canarian giant lizard (Gallotia stehlini)

Family Scincidae

ocellated skink (Chalcides ocellatus)

Family Teiidae

common ameiva (Ameiva ameiva)

Species infecting mammals

Sarcocystis americana
Sarcocystis arieticanis
Sarcocystis asinus
Sarcocystis aucheniae
Sarcocystis bertrami
Sarcocystis bigemina
Sarcocystis booliati
Sarcocystis bovifelis
Sarcocystis bovicanis
Sarcocystis bovihominis
Sarcocystis buffalonis
Sarcocystis cameli
Sarcocystis camelopardalis
Sarcocystis campestris
Sarcocystis canis
Sarcocystis capracanis
Sarcocystis cernae
Sarcocystis cervicanis
Sarcocystis cuniculi
Sarcocystis crotali
Sarcocystis cruzi
Sarcocystis cymruensis
Sarcocystis danzani
Sarcocystis dasypi
Sarcocystis debonei
Sarcocystis diminuta
Sarcocystis dirumpens
Sarcocystis dubeyella
Sarcocystis dubeyi
Sarcocystis equicanis
Sarcocystis fayeri
Sarcocystis felis
Sarcocystis fusiformis
Sarcocystis garnhami
Sarcocystis gigantea
Sarcocystis giraffae
Sarcocystis gracilis
Sarcocystis greineri
Sarcocystis grueneri
Sarcocystis hardangeri
Sarcocystis hemioni
Sarcocystis hemionilatrantis
Sarcocystis hericanis
Sarcocystis hirsuta
Sarcocystis hjorti
Sarcocystis hofmanni
Sarcocystis hominis
Sarcocystis horvathi
Sarcocystis hircicanis
Sarcocystis iberica
Sarcocystis idahoensis
Sarcocystis inghami
Sarcocystis jorrini
Sarcocystis klaseriensis
Sarcocystis kirkpatricki
Sarcocystis kortei
Sarcocystis lamacanis
Sarcocystis leporum
Sarcocystis levinei
Sarcocystis lindemanni
Sarcocystis lindsayi
Sarcocystis linearis
Sarcocystis medusiformis
Sarcocystis meischeriana
Sarcocystis mephitisi
Sarcocystis mihoensis
Sarcocystis mongolica
Sarcocystis morae
Sarcocystis moulei
Sarcocystis mucosa
Sarcocystis murinotechis
Sarcocystis muris
Sarcocystis neotomafelis
Sarcocystis muriviperae
Sarcocystis neuroma
Sarcocystis nesbitti
Sarcocystis odoi
Sarcocystis orientalis
Sarcocystis ovicanis
Sarcocystis ovifelis
Sarcocystis oviformis
Sarcocystis ovalis
Sarcocystis phacochoeri
Sarcocystis porcifelis
Sarcocystis rangi
Sarcocystis rangiferi
Sarcocystis rauschorum
Sarcocystis sebeki
Sarcocystis sibirica
Sarcocystis sigmodontis
Sarcocystis suicanis
Sarcocystis suihominis
Sarcocystis sulawesiensis
Sarcocystis sybillensis
Sarcocystis tarandi
Sarcocystis tilopodi
Sarcocystis tenella
Sarcocystis ursusi
Sarcocystis venatoria
Sarcocystis wapiti

Species infecting birds

Sarcocystis accipitris
Sarcocystis cornixi
Sarcocystis debonei
Sarcocystis dispersa
Sarcocystis falcatula
Sarcocystis horvathi
Sarcocystis kirmsei
Sarcocystis phoeniconaii
Sarcocystis rauschorum
Sarcocystis rileyi
Sarcocystis turdi

Species infecting reptiles

Sarcocystis ameivamastigodryasi
Sarcocystis atheridis
Sarcocystis chamaleonis
Sarcocystis gerbilliechis
Sarcocystis gongyli
Sarcocystis idahoensis
Sarcocystis mitrani
Sarcocystis murinotechis
Sarcocystis muriviperae
Sarcocystis podarcicolubris
Sarcocystis roudabushi
Sarcocystis stehlinii
Sarcocystis stenodactylicolubris
Sarcocystis turcicii
Sarcocystis villivilliso
Sarcocystis zaman

Species infected but parasite not yet identified

A number of species have been identified as being infected with Sarcocytis but the parasite itself has not been identified to species level. These host species include: 

Mammals

pronghorn (Antilocapra americana), yak (Bos grunniens), northern fur seal (Callorhinus ursinus), camel (Camelus dromedarius), alpine ibex (Capra ibex), hard ground swamp deer (Cervus duvauceli branderi), red deer (Cervus elaphus), Hoffmann's two-toed sloth (Choloepus hoffmanni), beluga whale (Delphinapterus leucas), sea otter (Enhydra lutris), bearded seal (Erignathus barbatus), donkey (Equus asinus), cougars (Felis concolor coryi, Felis concolor stanleyana), bobcat (Felis rufus floridanus), Atlantic white-sided dolphins (Lagenorhynchus acutus), guanaco (Lama guanicoe), alpaca (Vicugna pacos), otter (Lutra lutra), wild dog (Lycaon pictus), Bartels's spiny rat (Maxomys bartelsii), Musschenbroek's spiny rat (Maxomys musschenbroekii), prairie vole (Microtus ochrogaster), common European weasel (Mustela nivalis), mink (Mustela vison), muskrat (Ondatra zibethica), mountain goats (Oreamnos americanus), Grant's gazelle (Nanger granti), slow loris (Nycticebus coucang), African lions (Panthera leo), leopard (Panthera pardus), tiger (Panthera tigris), baboon (Papio cynocephalus), Pacific harbor seal (Phoca vitulina richardsi)
chamois (Rupicapra rupicapra), Polynesian rat (Rattus exulans), bush rat (Rattus fuscipes), yellow-tailed rat (Rattus xanthurus), tamarin (Saguinus oedipus), cottontail rabbit (Sylvilagus floridanus), African buffalo (Syncerus caffer), eastern chipmunk (Tamias striatus), polar bear (Ursus maritimus), sea lion (Zalophus californianus) and hainag (also known as dzo or khainag)

Birds

goshawk (Accipiter gentilis), great blue heron (Ardea herodias), green backed heron (Butorides striatus), great egret (Casmerodius albus), little blue heron (Egretta caerulea), American white ibis (Eudocimus albus), bald eagle (Haliaeetus leucocephalus), wild turkey (Meleagris gallopavo), northern gannet (Morus bassanus), yellow-crowned night heron (Nyctanassa violacea), common pheasant (Phasianus colchicus), thick-billed parrot (Rhynchopsitta pachyrhyncha), northern spotted owl (Strix occidentalis caurina), capercaillies (Tetrao urogallus), masked owl (Tyto novaehollandiae) and mourning doves (Zenaida macroura)

Reptiles

southern copperhead (Agkistrodon contortrix contortrix), rhinoceros horned viper (Bitis nasicornis), carpet python (Morelia spilotes) and desert viper (Pseudocerastes persicus)

Hosts infected where parasite species is known

S. accipitris - canary (Serinus canaria) - sparrowhawk (Accipiter nisus)
S. ameivamastigodryasi - teiid lizard (Ameiva ameiva) - Rio tropical racer (Mastigodryas bifossatus)
S. americana - mule deer (Odocoileus hemionus)
S. arieticanis - European mouflons (Ovis ammon musimon), sheep (Ovis aries)
S. asinus - horse (Equus caballus) - dog (Canis familiaris)
S. atheridis -  Nitsche's bush viper (Atheris nitschei nitschei)
S. aucheniae - llama (Lama glama), alpaca (Vicugna pacos), vicuña (Vicugna vicugna)
S. bertrami - horse (Equus caballus) - dog (Canis familiaris)
S. bigemina - dog (Canis familiaris)
S. booliati - moonrat (Echinosorex gymnura)
S. bovifelis - cattle (Bos taurus) - cat (Felis domesticus)
S. bovicanis - cattle (Bos taurus) - dog (Canis familiaris)
S. bovihominis - cattle (Bos taurus) - human (Homo sapiens)
S. buffalonis - water buffalo (Bubalus bubalis)
S. cameli - dog (Canis familiaris)
S. camelopardalis - giraffe (Giraffa camelopardalis)
S. campestris - Richardson's ground squirrel (Spermophilus richardsonii), 13-lined ground squirrels (Spermophilus tridecemlineatus tridecemlineatus) - American badger (Taxidea taxus)
S. canis -  Hawaiian monk seal (Monachus schauinslandi), striped dolphin (Stenella coeruleoalba), red fox (Vulpes vulpes)
S. capracanis - goat (Capra aegagrus hircus), sheep (Ovis aries) - dog (Canis familiaris), red fox (Vulpes vulpes)
S. cernae - mouse (genus Microtus) - falconids (genus Falco)
S. cervicanis - roe deer (Cervus capreolus), red deer (Cervus elaphus hispanicus)
S. chamaleonis - Fischer's chameleon (Chamaleo fischeri)
S. cornixi - hooded crow (Corvus cornix)
S. cuniculi - rabbit (Oryctolagus cuniculus) - cat (Felis domesticus)
S. crotali - house mouse (Mus musculus) - Mojave rattlesnake (Crotalus scutulatus scutulatus)
S. cruzi - bison (Bison bison), wisent (Bison bonasus), cattle (Bos taurus) dwarf zebu (Bos taurus) - dog (Canis familiaris), coyote (Canis latrans), wolf (Canis lupus), raccoon dog (Nyctereutes procyonoides), raccoon (Procyon lotor), fox (Vulpes species)S. cymruensis - bandicoot rats (Bandicota indica), brown rats (Rattus norvegicus) - cat (Felis catus)S. danzani - Mongolian gazelle (Procapra gutturosa)S. dasypi - nine-banded armadillo (Dasypus novemcinctus)S. debonei - cowbirds (Molothrus ater), great-tailed grackle (Cassidix mexicanus), common crackle (Quiscalus quiscula) - opossum (Didelphis virginiana)S. diminuta - nine-banded armadillo (Dasypus novemcinctus)S. dirumpens - African soft-furred rat (Mastomys natalensis), house mouse (Mus musculus), brown rat (Rattus norvegicus), Mongolian gerbil (Meriones unguiculatus), Djungarian hamsters (Phodopus sungorus)S. dispersa - long-eared owl (Asio otus), European barn owl (Tyto alba)S. dubeyella - warthog (Phacochoerus aethiopicus)S. dubeyi - water buffalo (Bubalus bubalis)S. equicanis - horse (Equus caballus) - dog (Canis familiaris)S. falcatula - Patagonian conure (Cyanoliseus patagonus), budgerigars (Melopsittacus undulatus)S. fayeri - horse (Equus caballus) - dog (Canis familiaris)S. felis - cat (Felis domesticus)S. fusiformis - water buffalo (Bubalus bubalis) - cat (Felis domesticus)S. garnhami - opossum (Didelphis marsupialis)S. gerbilliechis - Arabian saw-scaled viper (Echis coloratus)S. gigantea - sheep (Ovis aries) - cat (Felis domesticus)S. giraffae - giraffe (Giraffa camelopardalis)S. gongyli - skink (Chalcides ocellatus)S. gracilis - roe deer (Cervus capreolus) - dog (Canis familiaris)S. greineri - Virginia opossum (Didelphis virginiana)S. grueneri - fallow deer (Dama dama dama), Persian fallow deer (Dama dama mesopotamica), reindeer (Rangifer tarandus tarandus)S. hardangeri - reindeer (Rangifer tarandus tarandus)S. hemioni - mule deer (Odocoileus hemionus)S. hemionilatrantis - mule deer (Odocoileus hemionus) - dog (Canis familiaris), coyote (Canis latrans)S. hericanis - goat (Capra aegagrus hircus) - dog (Canis familiaris)S. hirsuta - wisent (Bison bonasus), cattle (Bos taurus) - cat (Felis domesticus)S. hjorti - red deer (Cervus elaphus hispanicus)S. hofmanni - roe deer (Capreolus capreolus), fallow deer (Dama dama dama) - European badger (Meles meles)S. hominis  - wisent (Bison bonasus), cattle (Bos taurus) - human (Homo sapiens)S. horvathi - chicken (Gallus gallus) - dog (Canis familiaris)S. hircicanis - goat (Capra aegagrus hircus) - dog (Canis familiaris)S. iberica - red deer (Cervus elaphus hispanicus)S. idahoensis - deer mice (Peromyscus maniculatus) - gopher snake (Pituophis melanoleucus), bullsnake (Pituophis melanoleucus sayi)S. inghami - opossum (Didelphis virginiana)S. jorrini - fallow deer (Cervus dama)S. klaseriensis - giraffe (Giraffa camelopardalis)S. kirmsei - hill mynah (Gracula religiosa)S. kirkpatricki - raccoon (Procyon lotor)S. kortei - rhesus monkey (Macaca mulatta)S. leporum - cottontail rabbit (Sylvilagus floridanus) - cat (Felis domesticus)S. levinei - water buffalo (Bubalus bubalis) - dog (Canis familiaris)S. lindemanni - human (Homo sapiens)S. lindsayi - opossum (Didelphis albiventris)S. linearis - red deer (Cervus elaphus hispanicus)S. medusiformis - sheep (Ovis aries), pig (Sus scrofa scrofa) - dog (Canis familiaris), cat (Felis domesticus)S. meischeriana - pig (Sus scrofa scrofa) - dog (Canis familiaris), raccoon dog (Nyctereutes procyonoides)S. mephitisi - skunk (Mephitis mephitis)S. mihoensis - sheep (Ovis aries) - dog (Canis familiaris)S. mitrani - skink (Scincus mitranus)S. mongolica - Mongolian gazelle (Procapra gutturosa)
 S. morae - red deer (Cervus elaphus hispanicus)S. moulei - goat (Capra aegagrus hircus) - cat (Felis domesticus)S. mucosa - Bennetts wallabies (Macropus rufogriseus), unadorned rock wallabies (Petrogale assimilis), Tasmanian pademelons (Thylogale billardierii)S. murinotechis - rat (Rattus norvegicus) - tiger snakes (Notechis ater)S. muris - mouse (Mus musculus) - cat (Felis domesticus)S. neotomafelis - woodrat (Neotoma micropus)S. muriviperae - mouse (Mus musculus) - Palestinian viper (Daboia palaestinae)S. neuroma - horse (Equus caballus), nine-banded armadillo (Dasypus novemcinctus), opossums (Didelphis virginiana, Didelphis albiventris), sea otter (Enhydra lutris), cats (Felis domesticus), skunks (Mephitis mephitis), cowbirds (Molothrus ater), raccoons (Procyon lotor)S. nesbitti - crab-eating macaque (Macaca fascicularis), rhesus monkey (Macaca mulatta)S. odoi - white-tailed deer (Odocoileus virginianus)S. orientalis - goat (Capra aegagrus hircus), rat (Rattus norvegicus) - Malaysian reticulated python (Python reticulatus)S. ovicanis - sheep (Ovis aries) - dog (Canis familiaris)S. ovifelis - sheep (Ovis aries) - cat (Felis domesticus)S. oviformis - Norwegian roe deer (Capreolus capreolus)S. ovalis - moose (Alces alces)S. phacochoeri - warthog (Phacochoerus aethiopicus)S. phoeniconaii - lesser flamingo (Phoeniconaias mirror)S. porcifelis - pig (Sus scrofa scrofa) - cat (Felis domesticus)S. rangi - reindeer (Rangifer tarandus tarandus)S. rangiferi - reindeer (Rangifer tarandus tarandus)S. rauschorum - varying lemming (Dicrostonyx richardsoni) - snowy owls (Nyctea scandiaca)S. rileyi - northern pintail (Anas acuta), northern shoveler (Anas clypeata), blue-winged teal (Anas discors), mallard (Anas platyrhynchos), American black duck (Anas rubripes), gadwall (Anas strepera)  - dog (Canis familiaris)S. roudabushi - bullsnake (Pituophis melanoleucus)S. sebeki - European badger (Meles meles)S. sibirica - roe deer (Cervus capreolus)S. singaporensis - black-headed python (Aspidites melanocephalus), reticulated python (Python reticulatus)S. sigmodontis - cotton rat (Sigmodon hispidus)S. stehlinii - Gran Canarian giant lizard (Gallotia stehlini)S. stenodactylicolubris - fan-footed gecko (Ptyodactylus guttatus), Jordan short-fingered gecko (Stenodactylus grandiceps) - Dahl's whip snake (Coluber najadum)S. suicanis - pig (Sus scrofa scrofa) - dog (Canis familiaris)S. suihominis - pig (Sus scrofa scrofa) - human (Homo sapiens)S. sulawesiensis - yellow-haired hill rat (Bunomys chrysocomus), fraternal hill rat (Bunomys fratrorum), Sulawesi giant rat (Paruromys dominator)S. sybillensis - elk (Cervus elaphus)S. tarandi - reindeer (Rangifer tarandus tarandus)S. tenella - sheep (Ovis aries) -  dog (Canis familiaris), cat (Felis domesticus), red fox (Vulpes vulpes)S. tilopodi - guanaco (Lama guanicoe)S. turcicii - gecko (Hemidactylus turcicus)S. turdi - European blackbird (Turdus merula)S. ursusi - black bears (Ursus americanus)
 S. venatoria - red deer (Cervus elaphus hispanicus)S. villivilliso - black-headed python (Aspidites melanocephalus), Malaysian reticulated python (Python reticulatus)S. wapiti - American elk (Cervus canadensis)S. zamani - Malaysian reticulated python (Python reticulatus)

Species infecting animals important to man
Species infecting catsSarcocystis bovifelisSarcocystis cymruensisSarcocystis felisSarcocystis fusiformisSarcocystis giganteaSarcocystis hirsutaSarcocystis leporumSarcocystis medusiformisSarcocystis mouleiSarcocystis murisSarcocystis ovifelisSarcocystis tenellaSpecies infecting dogsSarcocystis asinusSarcocystis bertramiSarcocystis bigeminaSarcocystis bovicanisSarcocystis cameliSarcocystis capracanisSarcocystis cruziSarcocystis equicanisSarcocystis fayeriSarcocystis gracilisSarcocystis hemionilatrantisSarcocystis hericanisSarcocystis horvathiSarcocystis levineiSarcocystis medusiformisSarcocystis meischerianaSarcocystis mihoensisSarcocystis ovicanisSarcocystis rileyiSarcocystis suicanisSarcocystis tenellaSpecies infecting sheepSarcocystis arieticanisSarcocystis tenella (Sarcocystis ovicanis)Sarcocystis gigantea (Sarcocystis ovifelis)Sarcocystis medusiformisSpecies infecting horsesSarcocystis asinusSarcocystis bertramiSarcocystis equicanisSarcocystis fayeriSarcocystis neurona (Sarcocystis falcatula)

Species infecting pigsSarcocystis medusiformisSarcocystis meischeriana (Sarcocystis suicanis)Sarcocystis porcifelisSarcocystis suihominisSpecies infecting cattleSarcocystis bovifelisSarcocystis bovihominis (Sarcocystis hominis) Sarcocystis cruzi (Sarcocystis bovicanis)Sarcocystis hirsutaSpecies infecting water buffaloSarcocystis buffalonisSarcocystis dubeyiSarcocystis fusiformisSarcocystis levineiSpecies infecting goatsSarcocystis capracanisSarcocystis hericanisSarcocystis mouleiSarcocystis orientalisSpecies infecting chickensSarcocystis horvathiSpecies infecting reindeerSarcocystis hardangeriSarcocystis rangiSarcocystis rangiferiSpecies infecting llamoidsSarcocystis aucheniaeSarcocystis tilopodi References 

 External links 
 
 Sarcocystis'' genome project 
 Review: http://cmr.asm.org/cgi/content/full/17/4/894

Conoidasida
Rodent-carried diseases

ru:Саркоцистоз